Cymau is a small village situated in the community of Llanfynydd, Flintshire on the edge of the mountains of north-east Wales. Its name is derived from the Welsh word cymau, an old form of the plural for cwm, "valley" or "hollow".

The village is located on the side of Hope Mountain, a land feature that can be seen for miles around. Neighbouring villages include Ffrith to the west and Brymbo to the south. The nearest settlements are Wrexham to the south-east and Mold towards the north-west.

The area is known for its scenic beauty and large number of available hill-walking routes. The summit of Hope Mountain offers views of the Cheshire Plain and, in the opposite direction, it is possible to see sunsets behind the Welsh hills.

The population of Cymau is around 350. The village boasts a pub (The Old Talbot Inn, now closed) and one parish church with a roof made from corrugated iron and also a chapel. The former village Post Office and general store closed in 2009.

During the winter months, despite the local bus being occasionally unable to traverse the terrain, the village remains reasonably accessible.

References

External links 

Photos of Cymau and surrounding area on geograph.org.uk

Villages in Flintshire